Grunk or GRUNK may refer to:

 GRUNK, the government-in-exile of Cambodia (1970–1976)
 Grunk, a fictional character in the Krummerne TV series

See also 
 Grank (disambiguation)
 Gronk (disambiguation)